Hospital Tycoon is a business simulation video game developed by DR Studios and published by Codemasters for Microsoft Windows. It was released in 2007 on June 5 in North America, June 8 in Europe and August 12 in Australia.

The game lets the player manage a hospital from a god view. Each different hospital is staffed by medical teams and is packed with ill patients. The player needs to manage the staff and ensure patients are cared for and have the correct treatment facilities. As time progresses, new equipment will need to be built in order to cope with incoming patients. The game can also be played in a sandbox mode.

Reception 

The game garnered low review scores from video game critics who criticised the game's graphics and bugs. Many reviews criticize the game for being derivative of Theme Hospital. The game has been praised however for its developed storyline, similar to television dramas such as ER.

See also
Theme Hospital
Two Point Hospital
Project Hospital

References

External links
Hospital Tycoon at GameSpot
 

2007 video games
Business simulation games
Codemasters games
DR Studios games
Gamebryo games
Medical video games
Single-player video games
Video games developed in the United Kingdom
Windows games
Windows-only games